Paso del Indio Site, also known as VB-4, is an archeological site in Vega Baja, Puerto Rico.  It was listed on the U.S. National Register of Historic Places in 2007.

It is "the largest and deepest stratified (approximately 5 m in depth) multi-component prehistoric occupation site discovered to date in
Puerto Rico, and possibly all Caribbean islands."

See also

List of Puerto Rican scientists and inventors#Archaeology

References

Archaeological sites on the National Register of Historic Places in Puerto Rico
Vega Baja, Puerto Rico
Pre-Columbian archaeological sites
Native American history of Puerto Rico
Former populated places in the Caribbean
Former populated places in North America